Bernard E. Gehrmann (November 6, 1920 – December 16, 2006) was a former member of the Wisconsin State Assembly.

Biography
Gehrmann was born in Mellen, Wisconsin, on November 6, 1920. He graduated from the University of Wisconsin–Superior and served in the United States Marine Corps during World War II. His father was Bernard J. Gehrmann who served in the Wisconsin Legislature and the United States House of Representatives. In 1945, Gehrmann married Mary Rose Jellish. They had five children. Gehrmann was a sales manager in Ashland and was the president of the Ashland County fair. In 1968, Gehrmann became secretary of the Wisconsin State Highway Department and the family moved to Dane County. Later, Gehrmann served in the Wisconsin State Transportation and Veterans Affairs departments. He died on December 16, 2006, in Madison, Wisconsin.

Political career
Gehrmann was a member of the assembly from 1965 to 1968. Previously, he was a member of the city council of Ashland, Wisconsin and the board of supervisors of Ashland County, Wisconsin. He was a Republican.

References

People from Ashland, Wisconsin
Wisconsin city council members
County supervisors in Wisconsin
Republican Party members of the Wisconsin State Assembly
United States Marines
United States Marine Corps personnel of World War II
Military personnel from Wisconsin
University of Wisconsin–Superior alumni
1920 births
2006 deaths
20th-century American politicians
People from Ashland County, Wisconsin